Mirko Tedeschi is the name of two Italian cyclists:
Mirko Tedeschi (cyclist, born 1987)
Mirko Tedeschi (cyclist, born 1989)